Erika Tinio Casupanan (born July 20, 1989) is a Canadian communications professional known for being the Sole Survivor on the 41st season of the American reality TV competition series Survivor. In doing so, Casupanan became the first Canadian and Filipino to win the competition series.

Early life
Casupanan was born in the municipality of Hermosa, located in Bataan, a province of the Philippines. When she was young, she emigrated with her parents to Canada. She grew up in Niagara Falls, Ontario, where she attended St. Paul Catholic High School. She later earned a Bachelor of Arts degree in Media, Information & Technoculture from the University of Western Ontario (Western University). Eventually, she moved to Toronto, where she worked as an agency consultant at Media Profile for five years, and a communications manager at Kijiji for four years.

Survivor
In 2020, Casupanan was cast on the 41st season of Survivor, a reality competition series that airs on Global. However, due to the COVID-19 crisis, production of that season was delayed until 2021. When production finally resumed, Casupanan and 17 other players were flown to Fiji to participate in Survivor 41.

At the start of the game, Casupanan was placed on the Luvu tribe. Initially on the outs with the rest of Luvu, she evaded immediate danger by virtue of Luvu winning immunity for the entirety of the premerge. Casupanan found her footing after the original tribes were dissolved, when on Day 12, she and fellow former Luvu member Naseer Muttalif were randomly chosen to sit out the immunity challenge. Following the completion of the challenge, the winning team chose to give Muttalif additional immunity and send Casupanan to Exile Island. While on Exile, series host Jeff Probst paid her a visit, presenting her with a brand new game twist. If she chose to do so, she could reverse the outcome of the previous challenge and give the losing team, and herself, immunity at the next Tribal Council. Her decision would be symbolized by an hourglass given to her by Probst: if she broke the hourglass, the winners of the previous challenge and Muttalif would lose immunity and have to compete against each other in an individual immunity challenge; if she left the hourglass alone, she and the losers of that challenge would compete against one another for individual immunity as originally planned.

On Day 14, after two days on Exile Island, Casupanan got to return to her fellow castaways, and upon her return, she announced that she had broken the hourglass, thus reversing the outcome of the previous immunity challenge. This guaranteed her a spot on the merged tribe, as she was now immune from the vote at the Night 14 Tribal Council. After former Luvu member Sydney Segal was voted off that night, the new merge tribe was formed. It was Casupanan who named it Viakana, which comes from the Fijian phrase for 'hungry'. There, she formed a close bond with another former Luvu member, Heather Aldret. The two women created a strong alliance and took control of numerous eliminations. Both of them were able to make it to the Final Four together.

On Day 25, Casupanan and Aldret lost to Xander Hastings in the final immunity challenge of the season. As a perk for winning this challenge, Hastings also got to choose one person to sit next to him at the Final Tribal Council on Day 26, meaning that the other two players left would be required to compete in a fire-making competition to determine the third and final finalist. Hastings chose Casupanan to bring into the finals, leaving Aldret to battle it out with Deshawn Radden in the fire-making contest. Radden defeated Aldret in a closely-contested battle, sending Aldret to the jury.

On Day 26, Casupanan presented her case to the members of the jury. Her respectable social and strategic gameplay and ability to avoid being targeted earned her the respect of the jury, and she won the title of Sole Survivor in a 7–1–0 vote. She earned the votes of everyone on the jury except Danny McCray, who voted for Radden to win.

On February 25, 2022, Casupanan was awarded the key to the city by Niagara Falls mayor Jim Diodati.

References

External links
Erika Casupanan at LinkedIn
Official CBS biography page

See also
Survivor 41

Living people
Canadian people of Filipino descent
Participants in American reality television series
People from Bataan
People from Toronto
Survivor (American TV series) winners
University of Western Ontario alumni
1989 births
Winners in the Survivor franchise